A continental divide is a drainage divide on a continent such that the drainage basin on one side of the divide feeds into one ocean or sea, and the basin on the other side either feeds into a different ocean or sea, or is unconnected.

Continental divide may also refer to:

Geography or topology
 Continental Divide of the Americas, which separates Pacific-feeding basins from Atlantic- and Arctic- feeding basins in the Americas
 Continental Divide Trail (also known as the Continental Divide National Scenic Trail), a scenic trail in the United States
 Eastern Continental Divide in the United States that separates the Atlantic Seaboard watershed from the Gulf of Mexico watershed
 For named continental divides by continent, see Continental divide

Places
 Continental Divide, New Mexico, an unincorporated community in New Mexico
 Continental Divide Raceways, a racetrack in Castle Rock, Colorado

Arts, entertainment, and media
 Continental Divide (film), 1981 romantic comedy
 Continental Divide: Heidegger, Cassirer, Davos, 2010 philosophy book
 The Continental Divide (album), 2009 album by American rock band War Tapes

See also
 Boundaries between continents (geophysical or geopolitical rather than hydrological boundaries)
 Triple divide, an intersection of two continental divides (or other drainage divides)